Otto Froitzheim defeated Oskar Kreuzer in the final, 6–2, 7–5, 4–6, 7–5 to win the inaugural Men's Singles tennis title at the World Hard Court Championships.

Draw

Finals

Top half

Bottom half

References

External links

Men's Singles